Kallithea (Greek: Καλλιθέα, meaning "beautiful view") is a district of Athens and a municipality in south Athens regional unit. It is the eighth largest municipality in Greece (96,118 inhabitants, 2021 census) and the fourth biggest in the Athens urban area (following municipalities of Athens, Piraeus and Peristeri).

Location
Kallithea extends from the Filopappou and Sikelia hills in the north to Phaleron Bay in the south; its two other sides consist of Syngrou Avenue to the east (border to the towns of Nea Smyrni and Palaio Faliro), and the Ilisos River to the west (border to the towns of Tavros and Moschato) (photo 2).

The site on which the city was developed covers the biggest part of the area to the south of Athens city center, protected in ancient times (5th century BC) by the Long Walls to the west and the Phalerum Wall to the east (photo 3). Somewhere within this area the ancient town of Xypete lay. The town and its citizens are mentioned, among other places, in Plato's Dialogs.

1896 and 2004 Athens Olympics
The plans for the establishment of the new city of Kallithea were officially approved in December 1884. On the longitudinal axis of the town (Thiseos Avenue), the Athens to Phaleron tramway once ran, from the beginning (1850) to (1955) and the end of its operations. Near the center of the town the Shooting Range (Skopeftirion) was built to house events of the first modern Olympic Games, the 1896 Summer Olympics, and these first modern games took place in three venues: the refurbished ancient stadium of Athens (Panathinaiko Stadium)  NE of Kallithea, the Neo Phaliron Velodrome (currently Karaiskaki Stadium)  SW of Kallithea, and the Kallithea Shooting Range (Skopeftirion).

Events of the Athens 2004 Olympic Games were also sited in the district of Kallithea, notably handball and Taekwondo in the new Sports Pavilion (Faliro) by the bottom of Syngrou Avenue, and beach volleyball in the Olympic Beach Volleyball Center on Kallithea Bay (Tzitzifies).

Growth
Between the first modern games (1896) and the 2004 Olympic Games in the city, Kallithea grew significantly. Initially the tramway depot and workshop were built here in 1910, followed by the Harokopios Graduate School (1925) and the Panteios Graduate School of Political Sciences (1928).

In the 1920s the town was flooded by thousands of refugees following the Greco-Turkish War (1919-1922), the Asia Minor Catastrophe (1922), and the Treaty of Lausanne (1923). These refugees arrived in Kallithea mainly from the south Black Sea (Pontus), from ancient Greek cities such as Sinope (now Sinop, Turkey), Sampsus (now Samsun, Turkey), Kerasus (now Giresun, Turkey), Trapezous-Trebizond (now Trabzon, Turkey), Tripolis (now Tirebolu, Turkey), Argyroupolis (now Gümüshane, Turkey) and other remnants of the late Byzantine Empire.

A few had arrived earlier (1919) from the north and east (Russian) coasts of the Black Sea, from places such as Odessos (Odessa), Marioupolis (Mariupol', the Sea of Azov) and elsewhere, after the failed attempt of the western allies (Greece included) against the young Bolshevik state during the Russian Civil War.

Black Sea immigrants of Greek origin also settled in Kallithea in the 1930s, as a result of the change of Soviet policy toward ethnic groups. Their origins were mainly in the east coast of the Black Sea (Batumi, Sukhumi, Novorossiysk, Anapa etc.)

The first refugees settled originally near the site of the first Olympic shooting range (1896), until they were gradually transferred to new dwellings. After its evacuation the building bound with the shooting range served as a school, until the Nazi Occupation of 1941, when it was converted to a prison. The prison of Kallithea was demolished in 1966; among others, fighters of the Greek Resistance and victims of the Greek Civil War had been jailed there, such as Nikos Beloyannis.

In the 1990s, after the dissolution of the Soviet Union, a new wave of Greek immigrants arrived in Kallithea from the east coast of the Black Sea, from the Caucasus highlands in Georgia, as well as from distant Greek settlements in Kazakhstan and Uzbekistan where their Black Sea Greek ancestors were expelled during Joseph Stalin's regime in the 1930s.

Historical population

Culture
Kallithea's main cultural center is the Stavros Niarchos Foundation Cultural Center. South Kallithea (Tzitzifies), is associated with the development of Greek folk music, particularly rebetiko and later laïkó. Popular composers and singers once performed here; Markos Vamvakaris, Vassilis Tsitsanis, Yannis Papaioannou, Marika Ninou, Sotiria Bellou, Manolis Chiotis, Mary Linda, Giorgos Zampetas, Stelios Kazantzidis, Marinella, Poly Panou, and Viki Moscholiou.

Education
Kallithea houses two universities (Harokopio University and Panteion University). An even more notable school in Kallithea is Sivitanidios School, one of the oldest technical school in Greece.

Sports
Until 2004, south Kallithea (Tzitzifies) housed the only horse track in Greece (Ippodromos - Hippodrome), which later moved to Markopoulon,  near Eleftherios Venizelos Airport. Kallithea houses numerous cultural associations and several sport clubs, the most well known of which are Athens Kallithea F.C. (soccer), Esperos (basketball, volleyball, handball, and also soccer in an earlier period) and Ikaros Kallitheas, a multisport club founded in 1991, originally as Ikaros Nea Smyrni. Kallithea had another important club, Esperides Kallithea with many titles in women basketball. This club merged to Ikaros Kallithea in 2012.

Transportation
The main roads of Kallithea are Andrea Syngrou Avenue towards eastern Athens and Poseidonos Avenue towards Piraeus and the other southern suburbs. Kallithea is served by Metro line 1 stations Kallithea and Tavros, by the tram stations Kallithea and Tzitzifies, and numerous bus and trolley-bus linesconnect Kallithea to almost every destination in metropolitan Athens.

Sites of interest

 Harokopio University
 Panteion University
 Municipal Gallery, housed in the Laskaridou building, one of the first dwellings in the city.
 Aghia Eleousa church of the late Byzantine period.
 Kallithea monument, a fourth-century BC family tomb, one of the most impressive exhibits of the Piraeus Archaeological Museum.
 "Argonauts-Comnenus" (Argonaftes-Komnini) fraternity of the Pontus Greeks, aiming at the study and preservation of the history and traditions of their fatherlands.
 "Constantinopolitan Society" (Syllogos Konstantinoupoliton) of the Constantinople Greeks that settled in Kallithea forced to abandon Istanbul during the Greek Genocide and after the Greco-Turkish War (1919-1922) as well as after the Varlik Vergisi, the Istanbul Pogrom and generally in subsequent deteriorations of Greco-Turkish relations.
 Monument in memory of the Pontus Greeks in the center of the city (Davaki Square and Gardens).
 Faliro Coastal Zone Olympic Complex on Kallithea beach from the Sports Pavilion (Faliro) to the Olympic Beach Volleyball Center and the delta of the River Ilisos.
 Grigoris Lambrakis Stadium, home to Kallithea FC since 1972.

Notable people 
Demis Anastasiadis, singer and songwriter
Foivos Delivorias, singer and songwriter
Eleni Foureira, singer, actress, dancer, and fashion designer
Stamatis Kraounakis, composer

Gallery

See also
 List of cities in Greece

References

External links
 Municipality of Kallithea homepage
 Panteion University homepage
 Harokopion University homepage
 Kallithea FC homepage
 Esperos sports club homepage

 
Venues of the 1896 Summer Olympics
Venues of the 2004 Summer Olympics
Olympic shooting venues
Municipalities of Attica
Populated places in South Athens (regional unit)